Blue Ridge Crossing is a shopping center located in Kansas City, Missouri and Independence, Missouri at the intersections of I-70, US 40 Highway at Exit 11 & Sterling Avenue at Exit 10.

Location
The location surrounds the area from Interstate 70/US Highway 40 - to 43rd Street on the North/South and Northern Avenue to Blue Ridge Boulevard on the West/East. It sits on the site of the former Blue Ridge Mall and is about one mile (1.6 km) from the Truman Sports Complex at Exit 9. Phase I of the development began in 2005 with the first stores opening in early 2007.  Phase II  consists of land West of Sterling Avenue, and is slated to begin construction in late 2012.  Phase III  consists of land East of Blue Ridge Boulevard on the former site of the Blue Ridge Cinema East in Independence, Missouri.

Blue Ridge Mall
Blue Ridge Mall was one of the first shopping malls built in the United States.   Located in Kansas City, Missouri, on I-70 & Sterling Avenue at Exit 10. The location surrounds the area from U.S. Route 40 to 43rd Street on the North/South and Sterling Avenue to Blue Ridge Boulevard on the West/East. It sits on the site of Blue Ridge Crossing  and is about one mile (1.6 km) from the Truman Sports Complex at Exit 9. It opened on October 17, 1957 as an open-air shopping center and included a location of Harzfeld's.  H. Roe Bartle, the Mayor of Kansas City, cut the ribbon that officially opened the shopping center.

Blue Ridge Mall had the added distinction of being located in two cities at the same time.  The city limits of Kansas City, Missouri and Independence, Missouri bisected The Jones Store Co. on the northeast corner of the store.

During the 1960s, Blue Ridge Mall was the most popular shopping center in the Kansas City Metropolitan area and in 1971, the J. C. Penney store expanded moving from the south court of the mall to become an anchor store on the west end.  With that move, the shopping center was fully enclosed and the hey-day of the Blue Ridge Mall would continue for two more decades.

By the mid-1990s, the Kansas City Metropolitan Area had a 'mall glut' and with the close proximity of two newer enclosed malls within a ten-mile radius, Blue Ridge Mall started to show its age and declining popularity with shoppers.  After several ownership changes and a failed attempt at redevelopment when Montgomery Ward suddenly announced its bankruptcy and the closure of all stores nationwide at the close of 2000, the current ownership decided to demolish the old mall and start again. 

In 2001, J. C. Penney closed it store at the mall, leaving The Jones Store. The Jones Store shuttered in 2003, leaving the mall with no anchors.

Tax Increment Financing was obtained from the City of Kansas City and demolition began in 2005.  The redeveloped site is now known as Blue Ridge Crossing and the old mall site represents Phase I in a three phase development.

References

External links
 LANE4 Projects
 Rebuild Remarkable
 Parent Company
 Always Low Prices AND Environmental Clean-ups?
 Labelscar page on Blue Ridge Mall
 Dead Malls.com feature on Blue Ridge Mall
 TIF Plan For Redevelopment

Shopping malls established in 2007
Shopping malls in Missouri
Buildings and structures in Kansas City, Missouri
Economy of Kansas City, Missouri
Buildings and structures in Independence, Missouri